Charles Vanhoutte (born 16 September 1998) is a Belgian professional footballer who plays for Cercle Brugge in the Belgian First Division A as a midfielder.

Career
Vanhoutte progressed through the youth teams of KSC Wielsbeke and Zulte Waregem before finally ending up in the youth academy of Cercle Brugge. In July 2018, he was promoted to the first team and signed his first professional contract alongside fellow youth prospect Robbe Decostere. 

On 14 May 2019, caretaker manager José Jeunechamps gave Vanhoutte his debut in the Europa League play-offs loss to Royal Excel Mouscron. In the 56th minute, Vanhoutte came onto the pitch to replace Naomichi Ueda. In his first season, he made two appearances in the play-offs.

On 1 September 2019, Vanhoutte was sent on loan to Tubize together with teammate Robbe Decostere on a one-year deal. Vanhoutte played regularly, but was unable to prevent the club from suffering relegation to the Belgian Division 2. 

After his loan spell, Vanhoutte became a permanent starter at Cercle Brugge, where he signed a contract extension until June 2023 in December 2020, just like fellow academy players Decostere and Thibo Somers.

Career statistics

References

External links

1998 births
Living people
Sportspeople from Kortrijk
Footballers from West Flanders
Belgian footballers
Association football defenders
Belgian Pro League players
Belgian Third Division players
S.V. Zulte Waregem players
Cercle Brugge K.S.V. players
A.F.C. Tubize players